Waltraud J. "Traudl" Hecher-Görgl (28 September 1943 – 10 January 2023) was an Austrian World Cup alpine ski racer and Olympic medalist.

Hecher won Olympic bronze medals in the downhill in 1960 at Squaw Valley and in 1964 at Innsbruck.  Her medal in 1960 at age 16 made her the youngest alpine skiing medalist ever, an honor she retains over fifty years later. She raced through the 1967 season, the first year of World Cup competition.

Personal life
Hecher was born in Schwaz, Tyrol. She retired in the summer of 1967. She later married Anton Görgl and settled in Styria. Her son Stephan Görgl (b. 1978) and daughter Elisabeth Görgl (b. 1981) are both alpine racers who have represented Austria at the Winter Olympics. Stephan competed in the giant slalom in  2006 and Elisabeth competed in the downhill in 2006 and 2010. She won bronze in the latter, a half-century after her mother won bronze in the same event. One year later, Elisabeth became double world champion in 2011, with victories in both speed events (downhill and super G) at Garmisch. In February 2014, Elisabeth also participated in four disciplines in the 2014 Winter Olympics (downhill, giant slalom, super-G and combined).

Hecher died on 10 January 2023, at the age of 79.

World Cup results

Season standings

Race podiums
 2 podiums – (1 GS, 1 SL)

World championship results 

From 1948 through 1980, the Winter Olympics were also the World Championships for alpine skiing.
At the World Championships from 1954 through 1980, the combined was a "paper race" using the results of the three events (DH, GS, SL).
Normally held in February, the championships were in August in 1966.

Olympic results

References

External links

 Traudl Hecher World Cup standings at the International Ski Federation
 

1943 births
2023 deaths
Austrian female alpine skiers
Alpine skiers at the 1960 Winter Olympics
Alpine skiers at the 1964 Winter Olympics
Olympic alpine skiers of Austria
Medalists at the 1960 Winter Olympics
Medalists at the 1964 Winter Olympics
Olympic medalists in alpine skiing
Olympic bronze medalists for Austria
Sportspeople from Tyrol (state)
People from Schwaz
20th-century Austrian women
21st-century Austrian women